This is a complete list of members of the United States Senate during the 114th United States Congress listed by seniority, from January 3, 2015, to January 3, 2017.

In this Congress, Barbara Boxer (D-California) was the most senior junior senator and Deb Fischer (R-Nebraska) was the most junior senior senator.

Sometimes a Senator is sworn in during the middle of the two-year Congress. This did not occur in this Congress.

Order of service is based on the commencement of the senator's first term. Behind this is former service as a senator (only giving the senator seniority within his or her new incoming class), service as vice president, a House member, a cabinet secretary, or a governor of a state. The final factor is the population of the senator's state.

Terms of service

U.S. Senate seniority list

See also
114th United States Congress
List of members of the United States House of Representatives in the 114th Congress by seniority

Notes

External links

114
Senate Seniority